South Main Baptist Church is a Baptist church in Houston, Texas. Located in Houston's midtown area, the church has a long history in the city. The church was named "Church of the Year" by Guideposts Magazine.

History 
The church was founded in 1903 as Tuam Avenue Baptist Church. It moved to its current location on South Main Street in 1930 and was renamed South Main Baptist Church. Between 1934 and 1939, the church hosted the University of Houston campus before the university moved to its current location on Cullen Blvd.

Sanguinet, Staats, Hedrick A and Gottlieb were hired to design the new structure in 1924 for the then Tuam Baptist Church. The church moved to its current location when the new building was completed in 1930. A service by Dr. George W. Truett was held to commemorate the new structure.

South Main is a member of the Baptist General Convention of Texas and the Cooperative Baptist Fellowship. It was a member of the Southern Baptist Convention for over 90 years, but has now withdrawn.

Missions 
South Main Baptist Church assisted in the creation of Operation San Andres, a non-profit group that feeds orphans in Peru.

Notes

External links
 South Main Baptist Church website
 Historic perspective
 South Main Baptist Church at Houston Artchitecture
 http://www.operacionsanandres.org/

Churches in Houston
Baptist churches in Texas
University of Houston
Churches completed in 1930